Wagtail is a free and open source content management system (CMS) written in Python.
It is popular amongst websites using the Django web framework. The project is maintained by a team of open-source contributors backed by companies around the world. The project has a focus on developer friendliness as well as ease of use of its administration interface, translated in multiple languages.

History
The Wagtail project was started in 2014 by Torchbox, a digital agency. The development of the CMS evolved from being the sole action of its creators to receiving contributions from 46 external contributors by its version 1.0 in July 2015. Since then, development sprints have been organised to foster the community. During those sprints, contributors gather to work on selected topics and steer the project. As of July 2016, 257 people had directly contributed to the code and translations. In January 2017, the core development team had increased to nine developers and the main GitHub repository was moved from the Torchbox namespace to a dedicated Wagtail namespace.

Notable uses
 NASA for the Jet Propulsion Laboratory website 
 Google blog 
 The 18F agency of the US Government for beta.FEC.gov
 Peace Corps on their site
 New Zealand Red Cross on their site
 University of Pennsylvania for the Wharton Tech Blog
 University of Duhok for their site
 California Institute of Technology for their site 
 University of Tasmania for multiple sites
 Consumer Financial Protection Bureau for their site 
 The UK's National Health Service migrated their main site to Wagtail, beginning in 2017.
 Nebraska Public Media — the state's PBS and NPR stations — use it for their site.

References

External links

Free content management systems
Free software programmed in Python
Software using the BSD license